Robert Morris Bungum (December 24, 1910 – December 25, 1976) was an American football player and coach. He served as the head football coach at Luther College in Decorah, Iowa from 1946 to 1949 after serving a brief stint as a coach in the Ames, Iowa public school system.

Head coaching record

References

External links
 

1910 births
1976 deaths
Luther Norse football coaches
High school football coaches in Iowa
People from Hayfield, Minnesota
Players of American football from Minnesota